Singkamas is a barangay located in Makati. It is a residential area with a population of 7,370 recorded by the 2015 census. The name derived from the word singkamas, a local term for jicamas.

History 
Singkamas was an integral part of Barrio Tejeros. It was then a sitio with about 200 houses of light materials and 150 houses of stronger built. In 1960, after the passage of Republic Act No. 2370 (Barrio Charter), Barangay Singkamas was officially recognized as a separate barrio from Barrio Tejeros. Inspired by their independent status, the inhabitants built their own house of worship — the Holy Cross Chapel — which became the rallying point of neighborhood rehabilitation. This landmark also became the center of public forum and festivities, like Christmas and Barrio Fiesta Celebrations. Being the second smallest barangay of Makati, Barangay Singkamas struggled to sustain its existence by depending on its meager income or revenue derived from tax collections, IRA and RPT entitlements.

Singkamas is a former sitio of Barrio Tejeros and was officially recognized as a separate barrio in 1960 by virtue of Republic Act 2370. The first move towards this independent status was taken in the early 1950s when the residents felt it would be more beneficial for them to have their own set of leaders and the autonomy to manage their own affairs especially its Barrio Fiesta.

As a result of the separation, the residents of Singkamas decided to build their own chapel, the Holy Cross, although it is located in Barangay Tejeros.

In the past, Singkamas had the unique tradition of hanging fresh and succulent turnips instead of the usual buntings during their fiesta. This practice gave the place its distinct name, Barrio Singkamas.

References

Barangays of Metro Manila